The Drover's Sweetheart is a 1911 film from the team of Agnes and John Gavin.

It was the first film they made for their own production company after leaving Stanley Crick and Herbert Finlay on 19 July 1911 and seems to have been made at Gavin's new studios at Waverly.

Very little is known about the movie, which is considered a lost film. It is not certain if it was ever even released commercially.

The film was supposed to be followed by another from Gavin called The Lubra's Revenge but is unclear if this was made.

References

External links

1911 films
Australian black-and-white films
Australian silent feature films
Films directed by John Gavin
Lost Australian films